Danja Akulin (Даня Акулин) (born 1977 in Leningrad, Russia) is a Russian visual artist.

Born and raised in Leningrad (St.Petersburg), Akulin relocated to Berlin, Germany, where he attended Berlin Academy of Arts and studied under the supervision of Georg Baselitz.  Akulin rose to prominence by creating pencil drawings of large format that reinstate this genre's autonomous value. Georg Baselitz says of the artist "Danja Akulin creates conceptual drawings, which he calls 'aesthetically minimalist'. Since they come from St. Petersburg, they look different from equally conceptual art by Californian artist Ed Ruscha, for example. After looking at his pictures, it is particularly exciting to see with your own eyes how many watts are used to light a stairwell in St. Petersburg. This is what good drawings look like."

Work

Penumbra

The word penumbra is often rendered "half-light." The Latin origin paene umbra literally means almost shadow. In between the shadow and the light there is a zone through which we may see what is in the penumbra, but we see it with this darkened hue, and it is problematic to say whether it is illuminated or not. In "Penumbra" series the light is radiated on to what is but a partially illuminated landscape. Through this light, emotions and thoughts within the duality of darkness and brightness are visually translated. The truth exists in the "in-between" area, the penumbra.

Signs

The "Signs" series fuse painstaking external drawing with profound internal drawing. The sign—segno di Dio, the heart and sense of drawing—is the hieroglyph that unlocks all the secrets, sacred and profane. As any time-honored symbol, that same Renaissance disegno which is “the source and soul of all species of painting and the root of any science,” the tokens of the contemporary age depicted in these works are full of worth and weight. Electronic read-outs, various kinds of official emblems, elements of urban and domestic graphic design. In their original state, they are reduced and de-emotionalized, but here life, ritualistically, is breathed into exhausted, prefab forms.

Simple Things

In "Simple Things" series the focus of attention is on the graphic structure of objects, transposing them to the planning stage, to the sketching stage, and presupposes meditation by the observers. Behind extensive line movements of the pencil, behind concentrations and dilutions of light and shade – associations, sometimes free, sometimes programmed, are revealed layer by layer. The works in these series intend, albeit only to a certain extent, to liberate symbols from their binding meaning, to make them part of the history of drawing.

Exhibitions

Solo exhibitions
 2014, Gallery J.J. Heckenhauer, Munich, Germany 
 2014, “Landscapes”, Poll Gallery, Berlin, Germany 
 2013, art KARLSRUHE, One-Artist-Show, Poll Gallery, Berlin, Germany 
 2013, “Charcoal on Canvas”, Mimi Ferzt Gallery, New York, USA
 2012, “Crepusculum”, TS Art Projects, Berlin, Germany 
 2012, "Penumbra", Erarta Gallery, London, UK (catalog) 
 2011, “Landscapes”, Gallery J.J. Heckenhauer, Brussels, Belgium 
 2010, “V.I.P.R.I.P.”, Michael Schultz Gallery, Berlin, Germany 
 2008, Mimi Fertz Gallery, New York, USA 
 2007, “Signs”, Triumph Gallery, Moscow, Russia (catalog) 
 2007, “Survival Craft”, Moscow Museum of Modern Art, Moscow, Russia (catalog) 
 2004 Galerie "Borkowski", Hannover, Germany (catalog) 
 2002 Galerie "Bellevue", Berlin, Germany

Group exhibitions
 2017, “This is The Sea”, Fanø Kunstmuseum, Denmark (catalog)
 2016, “Salon No. 1”, Galerie Christine Knauber, Berlin, Germany
 2016, “Under Cover”, Artdocks Gallery, Bremen, Germany
 2015, “Playing Pool With a Rope“, Metropol Park, Berlin, Germany
 2015, “Neu Gold“, Dortmunder U, Dortmund, Germany
 2014, “Strictness and Beauty”, Ural Vision Gallery, Yekaterinburg, Russia 
 2014, 6. Biennale der Zeichnung, Kunstverein Eislingen, Germany 
 2012, “Auf der ewigen Reise”, E.ON AG, Düsseldorf, Germany (catalog) 
 2012, “With Pencil and Crayon “, Poll Gallery, Berlin, Germany
 2011, “(Moving) Identities”, Gallery JJ Heckenhauer, Tübingen, Germany 
 2011, “Monte Verità”, Kunstverein Familie Montez, Frankfurt a. M. / Germany 
 2011, “Expression Beyond”, Rizzordi Art Foundation, St. Petersburg, Russia
 2010, Boomerang, Perm Biennial of Graphic Arts, Perm Museum of Contemporary Art, Russia 
 2010, ART.FAIR 21, MESSE FÜR AKTUELLE KUNST, Michael Schultz Gallery, Köln, Germany 
 2010, Munich Contempo, Michael Schultz Gallery, Munich, Germany
 2010, Art Paris, Michael Schultz Gallery, Paris, France 
 2009, Mimi Fertz Gallery, New York, USA 
 2007, Sputnik. New Painting from Berlin, Galerie Claudius, Hamburg, Germany 
 2005, Nord Art 2005, Rendsburg, Germany
 2005, Art Frankfurt, Subjective Obsessions, special show of the Galerie Michael Schultz, Frankfurt, Germany (catalog) 
 2004, KPM - Offenhallen, Berlin 
 2004, “Identity in the Digital Era”, Künstlerhaus Bethanien, Berlin, Germany (catalog) 
 2004, Kunstverein, Uelzen,  Germany
 2004, Galerie Apex, Göttingen, Germany 
 2003, Horst-Janssen-Museum, Oldenburg, Germany (catalog) 
 2003, Galerie Annelie Grimm-Beickert, Bamberg, Germany
 2003, Galerie Helmut Leger, Munich, Germany 
 2003, “Insights”, The Baselitz Class, Galerie Michael Schultz, Berlin, Germany (catalog) 
 2002, Art Summer 2002. Kunstverein, Oberhausen, Germany

References

External links and reviews
Artist's website: http://www.danjaakulin.com
"The Magic of The Horizon": http://www.tagesspiegel.de/kultur/landschaftskunst-danja-akulin-und-lucas-arruda-die-magie-des-horizonts/11181282.html 
"Nature In Light": https://muenchenphoto.wordpress.com/2014/12/20/natur-im-licht/
"Who Needs Color": http://www.artparasites.com/who-needs-color/
Danja Akulin: "Penumbra" at Erarta Gallery, review by Theodora Clarke: http://www.russianartandculture.com/review-danja-akulin-penumbra-at-erarta-gallery-by-theodora-clarke/
"Picture Preview. Danja Akulin's 'Penumbra'": https://www.independent.co.uk/arts-entertainment/art/features/picture-preview-danja-akulins-penumbra-7851047.html
"Penumbra: A new Exhibition by Danja Akulin Opens at Erarta Galleries London": http://artdaily.com/index.asp?int_sec=2&int_new=56003&b=basel#.V_-Z_ty1zW4
"Darkening - 1 (Shadow and Light)": http://www.verbunkos.org/2012/12/darkening-1-shadow-and-light.html

1977 births
Living people
Russian artists